The Salmon Arm Silverbacks are a junior "A" ice hockey team from Salmon Arm, British Columbia, Canada.  They are a part of the British Columbia Hockey League. The Silverbacks returned a BCHL team to Shuswap/Salmon Arm 12 years after the previous team ceased operations, known at various times as the Totems, Blazers, and Tigers between 1982 and 1989.

Season-by-season record

Note: GP = Games Played, W = Wins, L = Losses, T = Ties, OTL = Overtime Losses, GF = Goals for, GA = Goals against, Pts = Points

Notable alumni
 Kris Chucko (Calgary Flames)
 Ryan Duncan (EC Red Bull Salzburg)
 Andrew Ebbett (Anaheim Ducks, Chicago Blackhawks, Minnesota Wild, Phoenix Coyotes, Vancouver Canucks, Pittsburgh Penguins)
 Josh Manson (Anaheim Ducks, Colorado Avalanche)
 Brady Murray (Los Angeles Kings, HC Lugano)
 Brendon Nash (Montreal Canadiens, HC Kladno)
 Riley Nash (Carolina Hurricanes, Boston Bruins)
 Ben Street (Calgary Flames, Colorado Avalanche, Detroit Red Wings, Anaheim Ducks, New Jersey Devils)
 Travis Zajac (New Jersey Devils)

See also
List of ice hockey teams in British Columbia

References
2019 Coaching change
2020 Captain nomination

External links
Silverbacks Website

British Columbia Hockey League teams
Salmon Arm
Ice hockey clubs established in 2001
2001 establishments in British Columbia